Newcastle is a town in Lincoln County, Maine, United States. The population was 1,848 at the 2020 census. The village of Newcastle is located in the eastern part of the town, on the Damariscotta River.  Together with the village of Damariscotta linked by the Main Street bridge, they form the Twin Villages (see Damariscotta-Newcastle CDP).

History

Originally called Sheepscot Plantation, Newcastle was first settled in the 1630s by fishermen and around 50 families. Around 1649–1650, John Mason purchased a tract of land from the sachems Chief Robinhood and Chief Jack Pudding. The territory was claimed in 1665 by the Duke of York. Renamed New Dartmouth, the plantation was attacked and destroyed in 1676 during King Philip's War. When the war was over, some of the inhabitants returned. But it was destroyed again in 1689 during King William's War, and the village was not reoccupied for about 40 years. In 1730, Colonel David Dunbar, the superintendent and governor of the Province of Sagadahoc, resettled it as Newcastle, named in honor of the Duke of Newcastle.

In 1978, the village of Sheepscot on the Sheepscot River in western Newcastle was listed on the National Register of Historic Places as the Sheepscot Historic District. (The USGS recognizes Sheepscott, Shepscooke, Shippscutt, and Shipscot as variants of the name Sheepscot.)

Geography

Newcastle is situated beside the Damariscotta River.

The town is crossed by U. S. Route 1 and state routes 194 and 215. It borders the towns of Jefferson to the north, Edgecomb to the south, and Alna to the northwest. Separated by water, it is near the towns of Wiscasset to the southwest, and Nobleboro, Damariscotta, Bristol and South Bristol to the east.

Climate

Demographics

2000 census

As of the census of 2000, there were 1,748 people, 724 households, and 493 families living in the town. The racial makeup of the town was 98.74% White, 0.11% African American, 0.11% Native American, 0.29% Asian, 0.06% from other races, and 0.69% from two or more races. Hispanic or Latino of any race were 0.69% of the population.

There were 724 households, of which 28.6% had children under the age of 18 living with them, 56.5% were married couples living together, 8.0% had a female householder with no husband present, and 31.9% were non-families. 26.4% of all households were made up of individuals, and 12.3% had someone living alone who was 65 years of age or older.  The average household size was 2.37 and the average family size was 2.86.

In the town, the population was spread out, with 22.7% under the age of 18, 5.0% from 18 to 24, 22.7% from 25 to 44, 30.8% from 45 to 64, and 18.8% who were 65 years of age or older.  The median age was 45 years. For every 100 females, there were 88.0 males.  For every 100 females age 18 and over, there were 85.8 males.

The median income for a household in the town was $43,000, and the median income for a family was $51,250. Males had a median income of $33,750 versus $28,466 for females. The per capita income for the town was $24,289.  About 4.2% of families and 7.0% of the population were below the poverty line, including 6.1% of those under age 18 and 9.5% of those age 65 or over.

2010 census

As of the census of 2010, there were 1,752 people, 787 households, and 505 families living in the town. The racial makeup of the town was 97.8% White, 0.1% African American, 0.5% Native American, 0.3% Asian, 0.1% from other races, and 1.2% from two or more races. Hispanic or Latino of any race were 0.7% of the population.

There were 787 households, of which 23.8% had children under the age of 18 living with them, 52.9% were married couples living together, 8.5% had a female householder with no husband present, 2.8% had a male householder with no wife present, and 35.8% were non-families. 28.7% of all households were made up of individuals, and 15.2% had someone living alone who was 65 years of age or older. The average household size was 2.21 and the average family size was 2.70.

The median age in the town was 49.6 years. 18.6% of residents were under the age of 18; 5.2% were between the ages of 18 and 24; 19.8% were from 25 to 44; 33.4% were from 45 to 64; and 23.1% were 65 years of age or older. The gender makeup of the town was 47.7% male and 52.3% female.

Sites of interest

 Dodge Point Public Reserved Land
 Frances Perkins Center
 Newcastle Historical Society & Museum
 Lincoln Academy (Newcastle, Maine)
 Second Congregational Church (Newcastle, Maine)
 St. Andrew's Church (Newcastle, Maine)
 St. Patrick's Catholic Church (Newcastle, Maine)

Notable people 

 Edwin Flye, US congressman
 William T. Glidden, clipper ship line co-owner and railroad investor
 Frances Perkins, US Secretary of Labor under President Franklin Roosevelt
 Peter Throckmorton, American pioneer underwater archaeologist

References

External links

Town of Newcastle, Maine
Newcastle, Maine
Maine Genealogy: Newcastle, Lincoln County, Maine
Sheepscot Valley Conservation Association

 
Towns in Lincoln County, Maine
Towns in Maine